Deutsche Schule der Borromäerinnen Kairo (DSB) is one of Egypt's leading German schools in Cairo, Egypt. It is a private school that follows the German Academic System. Starting from September 2019 Franz Baur follows Georg Leber as Principal of the School.

Since 1946 it has been a school for girls.

See also
Deutsche Schule der Borromäerinnen Alexandria

References

External links
  Deutsche Schule der Borromäerinnen Kairo
  Deutsche Schule der Borromäerinnen Kairo

German international schools in Egypt
International schools in Cairo
Private schools in Cairo
Educational institutions established in 1904
1904 establishments in Egypt
Girls' schools in Egypt